The 1928 Talca earthquake occurred on 1 December at  near Curepto, Maule Region, Chile, with an estimated magnitude of 7.6 MW, 8.3 MS and 7.9 ML. In Talca, it lasted 1 minute 45 seconds.

There was damage between Valparaíso and Concepción, and severe damage on the coast from Cauquenes to Pichilemu, and in the following cities in the Chilean Central Valley:  Talca, Curicó and San Fernando.

In Talca there were 108 dead, 67 in Constitución, and 50 in the surrounding villages. Soon after the earthquake, the Barahona dam, in the valley of Cachapoal River, that contained copper tailings, collapsed, killing 54 miners.

In total, there were 279 dead, 1,083 wounded and 127,043 homeless.

See also 
 List of earthquakes in 1928
 List of earthquakes in Chile

References

External links 

Talca earthquake
Talca earthquake
Talca earthquake
History of Maule Region
Earthquakes in Chile
1928 disasters in Chile